Emgekchil is a settlement in the Naryn Region of Kyrgyzstan. It is part of the Naryn District. The population of the settlement was 3,353 in 2021.

Population

References

Populated places in Naryn Region